The mixed doubles of the tournament 2018 BWF World Junior Championships was held on 12–18 November. The defending champions from the last edition are Rinov Rivaldy / Pitha Haningtyas Mentari from Indonesia.

Seeds 

  Guo Xinwa / Liu Xuanxuan  (third round)
  Rehan Naufal Kusharjanto / Siti Fadia Silva Ramadhanti (final)
  Pramudya Kusumawardana / Ribka Sugiarto (quarterfinals)
  Ghifari Anandaffa Prihardika / Lisa Ayu Kusumawati (quarterfinals)
  Di Zijian / Li Yijing (second round)
  Fabricio Farias / Jaqueline Lima (second round)
  Fabien Delrue / Juliette Moinard (fourth round)
  Shang Yichen / Zhang Shuxian (semifinals)

  Wang Chan / Jeong Na-eun (semifinals)
  Hiroki Midorikawa / Natsu Saito (fourth round)
  William Villeger / Sharone Bauer (third round)
  Weeraphat Phakrajung / Chasinee Korepap (second round)
  Maxime Briot / Ainoa Desmons (second round)
  Wessel van der Aar / Alyssa Tirtosentono (second round)
  Bruno Barrueto Deza / Fernanda Saponara Rivva (second round)
  Shin Tae-yang / Lee Jung-hyun (fourth round)

Draw

Finals

Top half

Section 1

Section 2

Section 3

Section 4

Bottom half

Section 5

Section 6

Section 7

Section 8

References

2018 BWF World Junior Championships
World Junior